The Lancair Tigress was an American homebuilt aircraft that was designed by Lance Neibauer and intended for production by Lancair of Redmond, Oregon. Introduced in mid-late 1990s, it was essentially a Lancair IV with a much more powerful engine. When the engine was cancelled just as it was entering production, the Tigress project ended with it. Only prototypes were produced.

The concept of a higher-powered Lancair IV derivative was finally filled by the Lancair Propjet.

Design and development
To accept the higher power and the increased speeds the airframe was structurally strengthened. The engine was later cancelled by its manufacturer, Orenda Aerospace, and the Tigress kit was not produced as a result.

The aircraft featured a cantilever low-wing, a four-seat pressurized cabin, retractable tricycle landing gear and a single engine in tractor configuration.

The Tigress was made from composites, including graphite fiber. The Tigress's wing used a McWilliams RXM5-217 airfoil at the wing root, transitioning to a NACA 64-212 at the wing tip, the same as employed on the Lancair IV.

Operational history
The sole prototype was deregistered on 27 June 2013 and sold, with the tail number (N750L) reserved through 2018. It is preserved on a concrete pad in front of the Civil Aerospace Medical Institute building at the Mike Monroney Aeronautical Center in Oklahoma City, Oklahoma.

Specifications (Tigress)

References

Further reading
 Power Struggle. Why car engines won't fly. Don Sherman; Smithsonian Air & Space magazine; Dec 1996–Jan 1997 issue, pag 71–81. (Detailed discussion on the development history and fate of the V-8 engine in the Lancair Tigress).

Tigress
1990s United States sport aircraft
1990s United States civil utility aircraft
Single-engined tractor aircraft
Low-wing aircraft
Homebuilt aircraft